NGC 830 is a barred lenticular galaxy in the constellation Cetus. It is estimated to be about 170 million light-years from the Milky Way and has a diameter of approximately 70,000 light years.

See also 
 List of NGC objects (1–1000)

References

External links 
 

Barred lenticular galaxies
0830
Cetus (constellation)
008201